Daiju Hisateru (born 19 March 1950 as Toshiaki Sakaiya) is a former sumo wrestler from Hokkaidō, Japan. His highest rank was ōzeki, but he held the rank for only five tournaments, fewer than any ōzeki in the modern era. He won eleven sanshō or special prizes during his top division career which lasted from 1970 to 1977. He was the head coach of Asahiyama stable from 1997 until 2015.

Career
Born in Setana, he joined the small Takashima stable  run by former ōzeki  Mitsuneyama in March 1965. He reached the top makuuchi division in May 1970 after winning the jūryō division championship with a 14–1 record. He was awarded the Technique Prize in his first top division tournament. He was to win a total of eleven special prizes in his career, which at the time was second only to Tsurugamine's fourteen. His six prizes for Technique put him in equal sixth place on the all-time list, as of 2009. In March 1971 he made his san'yaku debut at sekiwake and defeated his first yokozuna, Taihō.

He earned promotion to ōzeki in 1973 after three consecutive double figure scores. He was a runner-up in the May 1973 tournament to Wajima with a score of 11–4 and defeated two more yokozuna, Kotozakura and Kitanofuji (the latter for the first time in twelve attempts). He did even better in July, defeating Kitanofuji again and finishing in third place on 13–2. He had a clean sweep of all three special prizes, the first wrestler ever to achieve this, and ōzeki promotion was confirmed. However, he was unable to prove himself worthy of champion rank. He had to pull out injured from his debut ōzeki tournament and held the rank for only five tournaments before being demoted. He was never able to return, and though he remained at sekiwake for four tournaments he then fell back to the maegashira ranks.

After a 4–11 score in March 1977 he finished his career back in the jūryō division, the first former ōzeki ever to compete at such a low rank. After three straight losses he pulled out of the May 1977 tournament and announced his retirement at the age of just 27.

Fighting style

Daiju was very much an oshi-sumo specialist, preferring pushes and thrusts to the opponent's chest rather than fighting on the mawashi or belt. His most common winning technique by far was oshidashi, a simple push out, which accounted for half his victories at sekitori level.

Retirement from sumo

After his retirement he became an elder of the Japan Sumo Association under the name Tateyama, and worked as a coach at his old stable until it closed in 1982 due to the ill health of his old coach. He then worked at Kumagatani stable until it too shut down in 1996, upon which he was transferred to Tatsunami stable. After twenty years as an assistant coach, in May 1997 he was asked to become head coach of the Asahiyama stable after the sudden death of the previous stablemaster, former komusubi Wakafutase, and he adopted the name Asahiyama. Daimanazuru briefly made the top division in 2006 and Tokusegawa was a member of the stable for a short time after it absorbed Kiriyama stable in 2011, but there were no more sekitori after his retirement. Asahiyama also worked as a judge of tournament bouts. Asahiyama stable was shut down in January 2015 as Asahiyama approached the mandatory retirement age of 65, and he moved to Asakayama stable. He left the Sumo Association in March 2015, opting not to be re-employed for five years for a consultancy role as allowed by a rule change in 2014. Instead the Asahiyama elder name was acquired by former sekiwake Kotonishiki.

He had a pronounced dome on his head, due to him injecting silicone to meet the Sumo Association's height requirements when he was first recruited as a wrestler. It was removed in 2010.

Career record

References

See also
Glossary of sumo terms
List of sumo tournament top division runners-up
List of sumo tournament second division champions
List of past sumo wrestlers
List of ōzeki

1950 births
Living people
Japanese sumo wrestlers
Ōzeki
Sumo people from Hokkaido